Round Britain Quiz (or RBQ for short) is a panel game that has been broadcast on BBC Radio since 1947, making it the oldest quiz still broadcast on British radio. It was based on a format called Transatlantic Quiz, a contest between American and British teams on which Alistair Cooke was an early participant.

The format of the quiz is that teams from various regions around the United Kingdom play in a tournament of head-to-head battles. In a half-hour programme, each team is given four multi-part cryptic questions, each worth up to six points, to be awarded on the host's judgement. The parts of the question are generally centred on a common theme, and a degree of lateral thought is necessary to score full marks.

One question for each team has a music or sound component, and another is submitted by listeners. Points are awarded to each team by the host/quizmaster. Team members may ask questions, to narrow the field; but the more they ask, or the more clues the host supplies to assist them, the fewer marks the team will score.

Until 1995, there was a "resident London team" which was challenged by teams from other parts of the UK (and sometimes the Republic of Ireland).  There were two hosts, one with each team.  In the 1950s, the hosts were Gilbert Harding and Lionel Hale. Later hosts, in various combinations, included Roy Plomley, Jack Longland, Anthony Quinton, Louis Allen, and, for many years, Gordon Clough.

The programme was formally taken out of production after the death of Gordon Clough in 1996, but was revived a year later with a single chairman and a new format of six teams playing four matches each.  From 1997 it was hosted by broadcaster Nick Clarke until his death in 2006. He was succeeded at the start of the 2007 series by Tom Sutcliffe. In January 2022 the BBC announced that Kirsty Lang would take over hosting from the series starting in March 2022 

Regional contestants have included Irene Thomas, John Julius Norwich, Fred Housego, Brian J. Ford, Patrick Hannan and Philippa Gregory. Current contestants include Marcus Berkmann, David Edwards, Adèle Geras, Stuart Maconie, Val McDermid, Paul Sinha and Frankie Fanko.

The original theme tune was "Radioscopie" by Georges Delerue. The current theme tune is "Scherzo and Trio" performed by the Penguin Cafe Orchestra.  On one occasion Gilbert Harding woke up naked and terrified in the North British Hotel in Edinburgh, his one-night stand having stolen his wallet, his clothes, and all the questions for that week’s Round Britain Quiz.

Puzzles like those in Round Britain Quiz (a series of cryptic clues linked by a common theme) have appeared in written form in publications such as BBC MindGames Magazine.

References

External links 

Brief history
UK Game Shows - Round Britain Quiz

1947 radio programme debuts
BBC Radio 4 programmes
British radio game shows
1940s British game shows
1950s British game shows
1960s British game shows
1970s British game shows
1980s British game shows
1990s British game shows
2000s British game shows
2010s British game shows